Picton railway station is a heritage-listed railway station located on the Main South line in the south-western Sydney suburb of Picton in the Wollondilly Shire local government area of New South Wales, Australia. It was built from 1863 to 1919. It is also known as the Picton Railway Station group. The property was added to the New South Wales State Heritage Register on 2 April 1999. The station opened on 1 July 1869. The station is unusually sited, with southbound journeys actually heading north out of the station before traversing a 225 degree horseshoe curve to again head south, and likewise northbound services heading south before rounding a number of curves to resume their true direction.

History

Picton
The town of Picton was named by Major Antill after Sir Thomas Picton in 1841. The location was previously known as "Stonequarry". The Duke of Wellington described Picton as a "rough foul-mouthed devil as ever lived" but very capable. He was "respected for his courage and feared for his irascible temperament". He was chiefly remembered for his exploits under Wellington in the Iberinan Peninsular War displaying great bravery and persistence. He was killed at the Battle of Waterloo and was the most senior officer to die there. He was buried in the family vault at St. George's, Hanover Square in London. In 1859 Picton was re-interred in St. Paul's Cathedral, London, lying close to the body of the Duke of Wellington.

Following the construction of a new alignment via Bargo in 1919, Picton became a junction station with the original line being retained as a branch line. These trains departed from a dock platform at the southern end of Platform 2. Picton previously had an extensive yard north of the station including locomotive servicing facilities and a turntable. A passing loop ran behind Platform 2 until 2011, when it was removed to allow a lift to be installed.

Picton is a destination for NSW Rail Museum steam trains from Thirlmere, although with the elimination of Picton yard, these now require a locomotive at each end.

Platforms and services
Picton has two side platforms. It is serviced by NSW TrainLink Southern Highlands Line services travelling between Campbelltown and Moss Vale with limited morning services to Sydney Central and limited evening services to Goulburn.

Description 
The railway station complex managed by the Transport Asset Holding Entity includes a type 3, second class station building, erected in 1863; a footbridge, erected ; and a two-storey, timber signal box with a hipped roof, erected in 1919.

Station building (1863)
The Station Building is a simple single-storey Victorian Georgian style building. The building sits on a stone plinth with painted brickwork walls and a symmetrical front elevation with 2 × 6 pane double hung timber framed sash windows.

The building has a linear arrangement with attached parapeted wings at each end containing toilets in one wing and lamp room in the other. The other facilities in the building include a ladies waiting room, telegraph office, booking office and clerks office and baggage office. Access to the platform is through the central booking office.

The building features a hipped slate roof with a major awning to the platform rebuilt at an unknown period and originally supported on columns. The street frontage has a hipped verandah supported on timber posts.

An indication of the individuality of railway station gardens is given by a hanging wall-mounted specimen of stag's horn fern Platycerium superbum) attached to the station building wall at Picton.

Footbridge

Signal Box (1919)
This is a large signal box located on the platform and was constructed in 1919. It is a timber structure with windows on three sides of the upper level. Access is from the platform via an external stair with WC on the landing. The roof is hipped, clad in corrugated iron overhanging on all sides to shade the upper windows. This is one of a small number of similar boxes remaining in the state.

Transport links
Picton Buslines operate six routes to and from Picton station:
900: to Campbelltown station
901: to Wilton & Douglas Park
911: to Buxton & Bargo
912: to Bargo & Yanderra
913: to Buxton & Thirlmere
914: to Buxton & Thirlmere

Berrima Buslines operate one route via Picton station for NSW TrainLink:
Loopline Bus: to Bowral station

Heritage listing 
As at 30 November 2010, Picton Railway Precinct is of state significance as one of the earliest surviving railway locations in NSW, opening in 1863 only eight years after the first line from Sydney to Parramatta in 1855. Picton Railway Precinct is significant as the terminus of the Southern line until 1867 prior to the extension of the Great Southern Line through to Mittagong, Goulburn and on to Albury. The construction of the line to Picton is significant for its association with John Whitton, Engineer-in-Chief of the NSWGR, and was one of his early achievements during his long career. The design of the Picton station building is also attributed to Whitton and is a fine example of a simple Victorian Georgian style station building that remains substantially intact. The signal box built in 1919 is a good example of an elevated timber signal box, representative of other similar structures in the network.

Picton railway station was listed on the New South Wales State Heritage Register on 2 April 1999 having satisfied the following criteria.

The place possesses uncommon, rare or endangered aspects of the cultural or natural history of New South Wales.

This item is assessed as historically rare. This item is assessed as scientifically rare. This item is assessed as arch. rare. This item is assessed as socially rare.

See also 

List of railway stations in New South Wales

References

Bibliography

Attribution

External links

Picton station details Transport for New South Wales

Easy Access railway stations in New South Wales
John Whitton railway stations
Railway stations in Australia opened in 1863
Regional railway stations in New South Wales
Picton, New South Wales
New South Wales State Heritage Register
Articles incorporating text from the New South Wales State Heritage Register
Main Southern railway line, New South Wales